Noël Juchereau, Sieur des Chatelets (30 August 1593 – c. 31 July 1648) was an early pioneer in New France (now Québec, Canada), and a member of the Company of One Hundred Associates since in formation in 1627.

Origins
Juchereau was baptised in Tourouvre, Perche, France on 30 August 1593 to Jean Juchereau (1567-1628) of Tourouvre and his first wife Jeanne Creste (d.1608). His father's family was from Mortagne, Perche, France and prominent in government. His mother's family were wealthy land owners from Tourouvre and L'Hôme. Juchereau had one brother, Jean Juchereau de Maur (1592-1672), who had two sons Nicolas Juchereau, sieur de St-Denis and Jean Juchereau, sieur de la Ferté.

The Juchereau brothers
Noël Juchereau and his brother Jean, with origins in Perche's Tourouvre hamlet, played a key role in the Percheron Immigration Mouvement toward Québec, Canada Nouvelle-France in the XVIIth century working closely with Robert Giffard, who spearheaded the movement, to recruit future settlers to the region. The Juchereau brothers were responsible for forty-one engagement contract destined for Canada largely executed by Tourouvre-based Choiseau notaries between 1646 and 1651.

Noël and Jean Juchereau were half-brothers to Pierre Juchereau, sieur des Moulineaux, who helped in the recruitment of engagés on behalf of Jean et Noël Juchereau. Pierre Juchereau never crossed the ocean to Canada.

New France
Noël Juchereau completed studies in the humanities and law, and was granted a Bachelor of Law degree. Juchereau first traveled to Québec in 1634, followed by his brother Jean with his family, in 1643.

Juchereau was an active figure in New France. The governor of Québec frequently sought his help with delicate legal matters.

Juchereau and Pierre Legardeur de Repentigny, originally created the Communauté des Habitants. He was appointed their head clerk in 1645. As a church warden from 1645-1646 he prominently participated in religious ceremonies central to Québec's social life.

Historian Benjamin Sulte believed that he was acting as an agent for Rosée and Cheffault who wanted a grant of part of the trade in New France from the Company of One Hundred Associates. The de Maur seigneurie, west of Québec city was granted to Jean Juchereau and Noël Juchereau in 1647.  This concession of land was inherited by brother Jean when Noël died.

Death
Noël Juchereau travelled to France in 1647 as a delegate of the Communauté des Habitants to obtain related organization changes. He drowned shortly before July 31, 1648, in Orléans, France.

References

Bibliographie
Key websites, acronyms & descriptions
 
 Fichier Origine - Répertoire informatisé de la Fédération québécoise des sociétés de généalogie en partenariat avec la Fédération française de généalogie
 Nos Origines - Site web, Généalogie du Québec et française d'Amérique
 PREFEN - Programme de recherche sur l'émigration des français en Nouvelle-France, Université de Caen

Bibliography

 

 in DCB / DBC

1593 births
1648 deaths
People from Orne
French people in New France